xv6 is a modern reimplementation of Sixth Edition Unix in ANSI C for multiprocessor x86 and RISC-V systems.  It was created for pedagogical purposes in MIT's Operating System Engineering course in 2006.

Purpose
MIT's Operating System Engineering course formerly used the original V6 source code. xv6 was created as a modern replacement, because PDP-11 machines are not widely available and the original operating system was written in archaic pre-ANSI C. Unlike Linux or BSD, xv6 is simple enough to cover in a semester, yet still contains the important concepts and organization of Unix.

Self-documentation
One feature of the Makefile for xv6 is the option to produce a PDF of the entire source code listing in a readable format. The entire printout is only 99 pages, including cross references.  This is reminiscent of the original V6 source code, which was published in a similar form in Lions' Commentary on UNIX 6th Edition, with Source Code.

Educational use
xv6 has been used in operating systems courses at many universities, including:
 Ben-Gurion University
 Binghamton University
 Columbia University
 Ghulam Ishaq Khan Institute
 Federico Santa María Technical University
 George Washington University
 Georgia Tech
 IIIT Allahabad
 IIT Bhubaneswar and PEC Chandigarh
 IIT Bombay
 IIT Delhi
 IIT Madras
 IIIT Delhi
 IIIT Bangalore
 IIIT Hyderabad
 Iran University of Science and Technology
 Johns Hopkins University
 Karlsruhe Institute of Technology
 Linnaeus University
 Motilal Nehru National Institute of Technology Allahabad
 National Taiwan University
 National University of Córdoba
 National University of Río Cuarto
 New York University
 Northeastern University
 Northwestern University
 Portland State University
 Rutgers University
 Slovak University of Technology in Bratislava
 Southern Adventist University
 Stony Brook University
 Technion – Israel Institute of Technology
 Tsinghua University
 Federal University of Minas Gerais
 University of Belgrade School of Electrical Engineering
 University of California, Irvine
 University of California, Riverside
 University of Hyderabad
 University of Illinois at Chicago
 University of Leeds
 University of Modena and Reggio Emilia
 University of Otago
 University of Palermo
 University of Pittsburgh
 University of Strasbourg
 University of Tehran
 University of Utah
 University of Virginia
 University of Wisconsin–Madison
 Yale University

References

External links 
 Operating Systems Engineering (6.828)

x86 (unmaintained):
 xv6 source code
 xv6 book source code
 xv6: a simple, Unix-like teaching operating system, xv6 book rev11.
 Printable version of the xv6 source code, rev11.

RISC-V:
 xv6 source code
 xv6 book source code
 xv6: a simple, Unix-like teaching operating system, xv6 book rev3.

Educational operating systems
Free software operating systems
Massachusetts Institute of Technology software
Software using the MIT license
Unix variants
X86 operating systems